Harmony (formerly Harmony Corners) is an unincorporated community located in the town of Grover, Marinette County, Wisconsin, United States.

Geography

It is connected by road to Peshtigo to the southeast and Marinette to the east (via Highway 64).

History
A post office was established in Harmony in 1885 and James H. Potter (1827–1905) was appointed postmaster. A cheese factory formerly operated in Harmony.

References

Unincorporated communities in Marinette County, Wisconsin
Unincorporated communities in Wisconsin